Leslie Carrara, sometimes credited as Leslie Carrara-Rudolph or the misspelling Leslie Carrera-Rudolph, is an American actress, performer, puppeteer, speaker, singer and artist.

She is probably best known as a Muppet performer on Sesame Street, most notably playing Abby Cadabby. She is also known for her original characters, including Lolly Lardpop. She is also a voice actress, creates artwork and performs in cabaret.

Career
Rudolph is known for performing the fairy Abby Cadabby on the PBS/HBO series Sesame Street, for which she was nominated for a 2009 Emmy Award for best performer in a children's series. She is also known for her puppeteer role as Ginger on the Disney Channel preschool series Johnny and the Sprites. She performed the Muppet, Jesse for Sesame Streets military outreach project Touch, Listen, and Connect, which starred Katie Couric. Rudolph plays various Muppet characters, besides Abby, on Sesame Street and has voiced animated characters and played live-action characters on the show. She got her start on ABC's Muppets Tonight as Spamela Hamderson and Darci. Other puppeteering credits include Edi the Zebra on Jim Henson's Animal Jam and the evil, blonde-haired vampire puppet in the movie Forgetting Sarah Marshall. Rudolph is one of the founding members of the Henson improv group Puppet Up!, which was later retitled as Stuffed and Unstrung. She was part of the improv cast for its debut at the Aspen Comedy Festival. She toured with them to the comedy festival in Australia and was a cast member for the off-Broadway show at the Union Square Theater. She also played the main role of Blue, the female blue puppy in Nick Jr.'s Blue's Room.

Her original character Lolly Lardpop has a musical comedy CD out called Sunkinsass. Rudolph portrayed the human children's show star Miss Poppy in the satirical play Pigeon-Holed, written by Sesame Street writer Annie Evans and Sesame Street puppeteer regulars. She does regular voiceover work, including characters in The Simpsons, Ratchet & Clank, and the English dub of the anime Zatch Bell. She has a BA degree from San Francisco State University in her major "Child Development Through the Arts". When she is not performing, she illustrates children's books and paints.

Rudolph performs an original, candy-obsessed character, Lolly, in several clubs and events in New York and Los Angeles, and works in children's outreach programs. Carrara-Rudolph released a Lolly children's CD called Spunkinsass.

Rudolph has written and produced several one-woman shows. Her latest musical, Entertaining a Thought, which was developed at the 2009 Ojai Play Write Conference, recently received a Jim Henson Foundation Grant and a 2009–2010 UNIMA Citation of Excellence in the Art of Puppetry. She just finished a run of her newest interactive show, Wake Up Your Weird, at the Center for Puppetry Arts in Atlanta. The show she created for the Disney company, The Wahoo Wagon, ran for six months at the El Capitan Theater in Hollywood and featured all of her original characters.

Some of Rudolph's voiceover credits include the voice of Peg Puppy for Nickelodeon's animated series T.U.F.F. Puppy, and additional voices for The Simpsons and for The Electric Company (2009 TV series), for which she voices Wolfman, Bat, and Mummy. She joined the cast of the podcast series The Radio Adventures of Dr. Floyd in the season 3 premiere and has guest-starred several times since.

She plays the character Bubbles in Splash and Bubbles.

She was an additional puppeteer in Julie's Greenroom.

Filmography
 Muppets Tonight - Spamela Hamderson, Darci, Shirley, Dorothy Bovine, Belle the Bubble Mom, Additional Muppets
 The Wubbulous World of Dr. Seuss - Little Cat A, Morton the Elephant Bird, Princess Tizz, Additional Muppets
 Animal Jam - Edi the Zebra
 Blue's Room - Blue
 Johnny and the Sprites - Ginger
 Sesame Street - Abby Cadabby, Lotta Chatter, Rosa, Sleeping Beauty, Virginia Virginia, Mrs. Grouch (episode 4237), Tango, Additional Muppets
 T.U.F.F. Puppy - Peg Puppy (voice)
 Frances - Mom (voice)
 Rugrats: All Grown Up - Myron (voice)
 Poochini's Yard - Wendy White (voice)
 Splash and Bubbles - Bubbles, Flo
 Ratchet & Clank: Up Your Arsenal - Sasha Phyronix
 Donkey Hodie - Dodie Hodie

References

External links
Official Website

Living people
American women singers
American puppeteers
American voice actresses
Muppet performers
Place of birth missing (living people)
Sesame Street Muppeteers
Year of birth missing (living people)